Mojtaba Mahboub Mojaz (born 24 April 1991) is an Iranian footballer who plays as a striker for Azadegan League club Baadraan Tehran.

Club career
He played his first match for Esteghlal during the 2009–10 season and later played on loan for Mes Sarcheshmeh. He joined PAS Hamedan in June 2013 and moved to Mes Rafsanjan in June 2015.

Club career statistics

Assists

Honours

Club
Iran's Premier Football League
Runner up: 1
2010–11 with Esteghlal
Third Place: 1
2009–10 With Esteghlal

References

1991 births
Living people
Sportspeople from Tehran
Iranian footballers
Association football forwards
Esteghlal F.C. players
Shahr Khodro F.C. players
PAS Hamedan F.C. players
Mes Rafsanjan players
Azadegan League players